Bangistan is a 2015 Bollywood black comedy satirical film directed by Karan Anshuman and produced by Farhan Akhtar and Ritesh Sidhwani starring Riteish Deshmukh, Pulkit Samrat while Arya Babbar, Tomasz Karolak and Chandan Roy Sanyal in supporting roles. Jacqueline Fernandez appeared in a cameo. The film was scheduled to release on 31 July 2015 but got delayed to 7 August 2015 (31 July 2015 in the United States). The Trailer of the film was released on 11 June. The film was released on 7 August to mixed reviews from critics. Mike McCahill gave it three stars  in The Guardian. Bangistan was released on 700 screens in India.

The film's satellite rights were sold to Zee TV along with the satellite rights of Dil Dhadakne Do.

Plot
The story is set in the fictitious country Bangistan, which suffers from a large number of terrorist attacks.

Hafeez Bin Ali is a Muslim in Bangistan who works at a call center. One day he quits his job as he can no longer tolerate the humiliation from customers and visits a local Muslim community. However, the leader of the community brainwashes him and persuade him to conduct terrorist attack at World Religious Conference in Poland, by convincing him that he will go to heaven if he dies in a suicide bomb blast. To cover his identity and his relationship with the leader, Hafeez uses a fake identity to enter Poland—a Hindu named Ishwarchand Sharma.

Praveen Chaturvedi is a Hindu who shows a lot of respect to his god Guruji and attacks anyone who insults his beloved god. For political reasons, Guruji asks Praveen to conduct terrorist attack at the World Religious Conference in Poland, the same event that Hafeez is going to conduct blast at. To cover his identity and relationship with Guruji, Praveen also uses a fake identity to enter Poland—a Muslim named Allah Rakha Khan.

Praveen and Hafeez meet at the airport when entering Poland, and later happen to live in the same hotel, so they befriend each other. When they go to a bar, they meet an Indian girl Rosie and both fall in love with her.

Hafeez goes to a Polish arm dealer and buys bombs from him, while Praveen buys bombs from a Chinese dealer. They both assemble bombs in their respective hotel rooms. Praveen accidentally sees Hafeez's bomb and gets to know his intention, and believes Hafeez is from his own team, so he reveals his intention to Hafeez too. They work together to make the terrorist attack plan. In the process, they begin to realize their bosses brainwashed and used them, but they did not give up their plans.

They break up a fight with each other after they reveal real identity to each other—Ishwarchand Sharma, a disguised Hindu, is actually a Muslim, while Allah Rakha Khan, a disguised Muslim, is actually a Hindu. They get angry after knowing each other is from a hostile religion and pretended to be a friend. During their fight, they accidentally set off the bomb, causing a huge blast in the hotel, and they both get injured and arrested for that.

Learning their arrest from news, both their bosses decide to go to Poland to conduct the attack by their own. Hafeez's boss sends a killer to kill Hafeez in the hospital, making Hafeez totally realize he was used. Police saves Hafeez from the killer and transfers him and Praveen to jail. On their way to jail, they escape from police. Hafeez decides to stop his boss from bombing the Conference and save lives. He also tries to persuade Praveen to abolish his plan and save lives too. Praveen pretends to have agreed, but is actually still in contact with Guruji to conduct the attack.

At the Conference, Hafeez catches Praveen red handed when the latter is tying bombs around his body. They break up a fight again and Hafeez successfully persuades Praveen to abolish his plan for real. Another bomber sent by Hafeez's boss tried to set an explosion at the event, but is stopped and taken down by Hafeez. Hafeez takes his bomb. However, the crowd did not see Hfaeez taking bomb from him but only see Hafeez has bomb in hand. They think Hafeez is a terrorist and going to making a blast. They begin to panic, and police arrive to arrest Hafeez.

In the chaos, the bomber takes the bomb back from Hafeez, Hafeez and Praveen fight with him to get the bomb back. The bomber sets off the bomb, but Hafeez and Praveen sacrifice themselves by holding the bomb and breaking out the window and jumping from the building. However, they survived the blast as it was not powerful enough to kill them. The Polish arm dealer saw the scene from TV and laughs out: Must be a Chinese bomb. He is right.

Cast
Ritesh Deshmukh as Hafeez Bin Ali/Ishwarchand Sharma
Pulkit Samrat as Praveen Chaturvedi/Allah Rakha Khan
Jacqueline Fernandez as Rosie 
Kumud Mishra as Guru/Abba
Chandan Roy Sanyal as Tamim Iqbal
Arya Babbar as Zulfi
Tomasz Karolak as Peter Jackson
Tom Alter as the Imam
Zachary Coffin as Stanislav the Polish Cop
Saharsh Kumar Shukla

Soundtrack
The soundtrack of the album is composed by Ram Sampath, and lyrics written by 
Puneet Krishna. The Soundtrack Album of this film was released on July 11, 2015.

References

External links
 

2015 films
2010s Hindi-language films
Indian satirical films
Indian black comedy films
2015 black comedy films
2010s satirical films
Films set in Poland
Films set in a fictional country
Films about terrorism in Europe